Edson Cavalcante Pinheiro (born 3 June 1979) is a Brazilian Paralympic athlete. He represented Brazil at the 2008 Summer Paralympics, at the 2012 Summer Paralympics and at the 2016 Summer Paralympics and he won the bronze medal in the men's 100 metres T38 event in 2016.

Notes

References

External links 
 

1979 births
Living people
Sportspeople from Acre (state)
Paralympic athletes of Brazil
Paralympic bronze medalists for Brazil
Paralympic medalists in athletics (track and field)
Athletes (track and field) at the 2008 Summer Paralympics
Athletes (track and field) at the 2012 Summer Paralympics
Athletes (track and field) at the 2016 Summer Paralympics
Athletes (track and field) at the 2020 Summer Paralympics
Medalists at the 2016 Summer Paralympics
Medalists at the World Para Athletics Championships
Medalists at the 2007 Parapan American Games
Medalists at the 2011 Parapan American Games
Medalists at the 2015 Parapan American Games
Medalists at the 2019 Parapan American Games
Brazilian male sprinters
20th-century Brazilian people
21st-century Brazilian people